American Desi is a 2001 American comedy film with Indian influence, notable for featuring many prominent South Asian American actors.  Also featured is an a cappella version of Nazia Hassan's Urdu classic "Aap Jaisa Koi", sung by Penn Masala and originally from the movie Qurbani.  The term Desi in the title refers to the people and cultures of the Indian subcontinent.

Plot
An American son of Indian immigrants, Krishnagopal Reddy, or "Kris" as he prefers to be called (to distance himself from his heritage), does not associate with the Indian culture that his parents have pushed upon him. Upon arriving at Rutgers University, he finds out to his dismay that all of his roommates are of Indian descent, and all except one are international students from India. His roommates include Ajay (Kal Penn), who idealizes African-American culture; Jagjit, who loves art but studies engineering to please his father; and Salim, who is very traditional and conservative, feeling that Indian-American girls are too Westernized to make good wives.

Kris meets Nina, a girl he immediately falls for, and is surprised to find out that not only is she of Indian descent, but she is also quite connected to Indian culture and speaks her parents' native language. Kris tries his best to win Nina over - from joining the Indian Students Association to be near her, to learning how to perform a Dandiya Raas. Kris eventually begins to enjoy the company of his roommates, all of whom put together their knowledge and skill to help Kris impress Nina through various ways involving Indian culture, which he eventually comes to appreciate.

Cast
 Deep Katdare as Krishnagopal "Kris" Reddy
 Purva Bedi as Nina Shah
 Ronobir Lahiri as Jagjit Singh
 Rizwan Manji as Salim Ali Khan
 Kal Penn as Ajay Pandya
 Anil Kumar as Rakesh Patel
 Sunita Param as Farah Saeed
 Aladdin Ullah as Gautam Rao
 Eric Axen as Eric Berger
 Sanjit De Silva as Chandu
 Sunil Malhotra as Hemant
 Ami Shukla as Priya
 Krishen Mehta as Mr. Reddy
 Smita Patel as Mrs. Reddy
 Bina Sharif as Mrs. Saeed
 Tirlok Malik as Mr. Saeed
 Ravi Khanna as Mr. Singh

Soundtrack

Track listing

Reception 
On Metacritic, the film has a score of 50% based on reviews from 7 critics, indicating "mixed or average reviews".

See also 
 Chutney Popcorn

References

External links 
 Home - American Desi
 

2001 films
2001 comedy films
Films set in New Jersey
Films about Indian Americans
Films by Desi directors
Films shot in New Jersey
South Asian American culture
Comedy films about Asian Americans
2000s English-language films
2000s American films